Novy Buravl is a rural locality (a selo) in Oktyabrvskoye Rural Settlement, Bobrovsky District, Voronezh Oblast, Russia. The population was 87 as of 2010.

Geography 
Novy Buravl is located 30 km southeast of Bobrov (the district's administrative centre) by road. Semyono-Aleksandrovka is the nearest rural locality.

References 

Rural localities in Bobrovsky District